The Dapper-class gunboat was a class of twenty gunboats built for the Royal Navy in 1854–55 for use in the Crimean War.

Design
The Dapper class was designed by W.H. Walker (who also designed the preceding  and the subsequent ). The ships were wooden-hulled, with steam power as well as sails, but of shallow draft for coastal bombardment in the shallow waters of the Baltic and Black Sea during the Crimean War.

Propulsion
Ten ships had two-cylinder horizontal single-expansion trunk steam engines built by John Penn and Sons, with two boilers. The other ten had two-cylinder horizontal single-expansion direct-acting steam engines built by Maudslay, Sons and Field, with three boilers.

Armament
Ships of the class were armed with one 68-pounder smooth bore muzzle loading cannon (SBML), one 32-pounder SBML (originally two 68-pounder SBMLs were planned but the forward gun was substituted by a 32-pounder) and two 24-pounder howitzers.

Ships

References

Bibliography

Gunboat classes
 Dapper